"I'm Stepping Out" is the third and last single from the final John Lennon and Yoko Ono album Milk and Honey. In it, Lennon celebrates his enthusiasm for the night life of New York City, and makes tongue-in-cheek reference to his "househusband" period.

The B-side features Ono's "Sleepless Night."

Recording
"I'm Stepping Out" was the first song to be recorded when the sessions for Double Fantasy/Milk and Honey began at The Hit Factory in New York City on 7 August 1980.

Reception
Cash Box said that the song "was a celebration for Lennon — to escape from the mundane lifestyle of a house-husband — and it is also a musical celebration for the listener which exhibits Lennon's innate talent for articulating universal emotions on three-and-a-half minutes of vinyl."  Cash Box also commented on the "accessible lyrics and a tight chorus that Lennon sings with abandon" and noted that the prologue and ending express Lennon's "witty side."

Personnel
This is the personnel as said.
John Lennon – vocals, rhythm guitar
Earl Slick, Hugh McCracken – lead guitar
Tony Levin – bass guitar
George Small – keyboards
Andy Newmark – drums
Arthur Jenkins – percussion

References

John Lennon songs
Songs written by John Lennon
Songs released posthumously
1984 singles
Song recordings produced by John Lennon
Song recordings produced by Yoko Ono
Polydor Records singles
1984 songs
Songs about New York City